The Fizeau experiment was carried out by Hippolyte Fizeau in 1851 to measure the relative speeds of light in moving water. Fizeau used a special interferometer arrangement to measure the effect of movement of a medium upon the speed of light.

According to the theories prevailing at the time, light traveling through a moving medium would be dragged along by the medium, so that the measured speed of the light would be a simple sum of its speed through the medium plus the speed of the medium. Fizeau indeed detected a dragging effect, but the magnitude of the effect that he observed was far lower than expected. When he repeated the experiment with air in place of water he observed no effect. His results seemingly supported the partial aether-drag hypothesis of Fresnel, a situation that was disconcerting to most physicists. Over half a century passed before a satisfactory explanation of Fizeau's unexpected measurement was developed with the advent of Albert Einstein's theory of special relativity. Einstein later pointed out the importance of the experiment for special relativity, in which it corresponds to the relativistic velocity-addition formula when restricted to small velocities.

Although it is referred to as the Fizeau experiment, Fizeau was an active experimenter who  carried out a wide variety of different experiments involving measuring the speed of light in various situations.

Experimental setup

A highly simplified representation of Fizeau's 1851 experiment is presented in Fig. 2. Incoming light is split into two beams by a beam splitter (BS) and passed through two columns of water flowing in opposite directions. The two beams are then recombined to form an interference pattern that can be interpreted by an observer.

The simplified arrangement illustrated in Fig. 2 would have required the use of monochromatic light, which would have enabled only dim fringes. Because of white light's short coherence length, use of white light would have required matching up the optical paths to an impractical degree of precision, and the apparatus would have been extremely sensitive to vibration, motion shifts, and temperature effects. 

On the other hand, Fizeau's actual apparatus, illustrated in Fig. 3 and Fig. 4, was set up as a common-path interferometer. This guaranteed that the opposite beams would pass through equivalent paths, so that fringes readily formed even when using the sun as a light source.

A light ray emanating from the source S′ is reflected by a beam splitter G and is collimated into a parallel beam by lens L. After passing the slits O1 and O2, two rays of light travel through the tubes A1 and A2, through which water is streaming back and forth as shown by the arrows. The rays reflect off a mirror m at the focus of lens L′, so that one ray always propagates in the same direction as the water stream, and the other ray opposite to the direction of the water stream. After passing back and forth through the tubes, both rays unite at S, where they produce interference fringes that can be visualized through the illustrated eyepiece. The interference pattern can be analyzed to determine the speed of light traveling along each leg of the tube.

Fresnel drag coefficient
Assume that water flows in the pipes with speed v. According to the non-relativistic theory of the luminiferous aether, the speed of light should be increased or decreased when "dragged" along by the water through the aether frame, dependent upon the direction. According to Stokes' complete aether drag hypothesis, the overall speed of a beam of light should be a simple additive sum of its speed through the water plus the speed of the water.

That is, if n is the index of refraction of water, so that c/n is the velocity of light in stationary water, then the predicted speed of light w in one arm would be

and the predicted speed in the other arm would be

Hence light traveling against the flow of water should be slower than light traveling with the flow of water.

The interference pattern between the two beams when the light is recombined at the observer depends upon the transit times over the two paths, and can be used to calculate the speed of light as a function of the speed of the water.

Fizeau found that

In other words, light appeared to be dragged by the water, but the magnitude of the dragging was much lower than expected.

The Fizeau experiment forced physicists to accept the empirical validity of an older theory of Augustin-Jean Fresnel (1818) that had been invoked to explain an 1810 experiment by Arago, namely, that a medium moving through the stationary aether drags light propagating through it with only a fraction of the medium's speed, with a dragging coefficient f given by

In 1895, Hendrik Lorentz predicted the existence of an extra term due to dispersion:               

Since the medium is flowing towards or away from the observer, the light traveling through the medium is Doppler-shifted, and the refractive index used in the formula has to be that appropriate to the Doppler-shifted wavelength. Zeeman verified the existence of Lorentz' dispersion term in 1915.  

It turned out later that Fresnel's dragging coefficient is indeed in accordance with the relativistic velocity addition formula, see the section Derivation in special relativity.

Repetitions 

Albert A. Michelson and Edward W. Morley (1886) repeated Fizeau's experiment with improved accuracy, addressing several concerns with Fizeau's original experiment: (1) Deformation of the optical components in Fizeau's apparatus could cause artifactual fringe displacement; (2) observations were rushed, since the pressurized flow of water lasted only a short time; (3) the laminar flow profile of water flowing through Fizeau's small diameter tubes meant that only their central portions were available, resulting in faint fringes; (4) there were uncertainties in Fizeau's determination of flow rate across the diameter of the tubes. Michelson redesigned Fizeau's apparatus with larger diameter tubes and a large reservoir providing three minutes of steady water flow. His common-path interferometer design provided automatic compensation of path length, so that white light fringes were visible at once as soon as the optical elements were aligned. Topologically, the light path was that of a Sagnac interferometer with an even number of reflections in each light path. This offered extremely stable fringes that were, to first order, completely insensitive to any movement of its optical components. The stability was such that it was possible for him to insert a glass plate at h or even to hold a lighted match in the light path without displacing the center of the fringe system. Using this apparatus, Michelson and Morley were able to completely confirm Fizeau's results not just in water, but also in air.

Other experiments were conducted by Pieter Zeeman in 1914–1915. Using a scaled-up version of Michelson's apparatus connected directly to Amsterdam's main water conduit, Zeeman was able to perform extended measurements using monochromatic light ranging from violet (4358 Å) through red (6870 Å) to confirm Lorentz's modified coefficient.
In 1910, Franz Harress used a rotating device and overall confirmed Fresnel's dragging coefficient. However, he additionally found a "systematic bias" in the data, which later turned out to be the Sagnac effect.

Since then, many experiments have been conducted measuring such dragging coefficients in a diversity of materials of differing refractive index, often in combination with the Sagnac effect. For instance, in experiments using ring lasers together with rotating disks, or in neutron interferometric experiments. Also a transverse dragging effect was observed, i.e. when the medium is moving at right angles to the direction of the incident light.

Hoek experiment 
An indirect confirmation of Fresnel's dragging coefficient was provided by Martin Hoek (1868).
His apparatus was similar to Fizeau's, though in his version only one arm contained an area filled with resting water, while the other arm was in the air. As seen by an observer resting in the aether, Earth and hence the water is in motion. So the following travel times of two light rays traveling in opposite directions were calculated by Hoek (neglecting the transverse direction, see image):

The travel times are not the same, which should be indicated by an interference shift. However, if Fresnel's dragging coefficient is applied to the water in the aether frame, the travel time difference (to first order in v/c) vanishes. Using different setups Hoek actually obtained a null result, confirming Fresnel's dragging coefficient. (For a similar experiment refuting the possibility of shielding the aether wind, see Hammar experiment).

In the particular version of the experiment shown here, Hoek used a prism P to disperse light from a slit into a spectrum which passed through a collimator C before entering the apparatus. With the apparatus oriented parallel to the hypothetical aether wind, Hoek expected the light in one circuit to be retarded 7/600 mm with respect to the other. Where this retardation represented an integral number of wavelengths, he expected to see constructive interference; where this retardation represented a half-integral number of wavelengths, he expected to see destructive interference. In the absence of dragging, his expectation was for the observed spectrum to be continuous with the apparatus oriented transversely to the aether wind, and to be banded with the apparatus oriented parallel to the aether wind. His actual experimental results were completely negative.

Controversy
Although Fresnel's hypothesis was empirically successful in explaining Fizeau's results, many experts in the field, including Fizeau himself (1851), Éleuthère Mascart (1872), Ketteler (1873), Veltmann (1873), and Lorentz (1886) found Fresnel's mechanical reasoning for partial aether-dragging unpalatable for various reasons. For example, Veltmann (1870) Explains that Fresnel's hypothesis was proposed as a "so-called compensation" of aberration which will "exactly cancel out" the deflection of Arago experiment. He then goes on to demonstrate a method for using Stokes' fully dragged aether in lieu of Fresnel's hypothesis which would still be "necessary at the end of the development." At the end he returns to the principle of Fresnel emphasizing that it is a mathematical relationship that represents a "common principle" to a "class of explanations" of starlight aberration by clarifying:

This line can be more directly translated as "the speed with which the movement of light to the movement of the [material] medium depends [, also depends] on the propagation speed [in the medium] and therefore [there] is needed a different one for each color." Thus confirming Fresnel's mathematical principle (but not his explanation) that rate at which a medium affects the speed of light is dependent upon the index of refraction which was already established to be a measure of alterations to light's speed dependent on frequency. 

However the historian Stachel in 2005 gives us a different interpretation that assumes the "one for each color" to mean ether instead of differing "rates" or "speeds."

Mascart (1872) demonstrated a result for polarized light traveling through a birefringent medium is insensitive to the motion of the earth. After establishing that Fresnel's theory represents an exact compensatory mechanism that cancels aberration effects, he discusses various other exact compensatory mechanisms in mechanical wave systems including the insensitivity to the doppler effect of co-moving experiments. He concludes "[Fresnel's] formula is not applicable to birefringent media." He finalized this report on his experiments in birefringent media with his finding that the experiment in anisotropic media produced a resulting quantity which was "four times lower than that which we would obtain by applying to the propagation of circularly polarized waves the formula demonstrated by Fresnel for the case of isotropic bodies."

Fizeau himself shows he was aware of the mechanical feasibility of Fresnel's hypothesis earlier in his report, but Fizeau's surprise and defied expectation of Stokes' complete drag was intimated at the conclusion to the report:
Lastly, if only one part of the æther is carried along, the velocity of light would be increased, but only by a fraction of the velocity of the body, and not, as in the first hypothesis, by the whole velocity. This consequence is not so obvious as the former, but Fresnel has shown that it may be supported by mechanical arguments of great probability.[...]
The success of the experiment seems to me to render the adoption of Fresnel's hypothesis necessary, or at least the law which he found for the expression of the alteration of the velocity of light by the effect of motion of a body; for although that law being found true may be a very strong proof in favour of the hypothesis of which it is only a consequence, perhaps the conception of Fresnel may appear so extraordinary, and in some respects so difficult, to admit, that other proofs and a profound examination on the part of geometricians will still be necessary before adopting it as an expression of the real facts of the case.

Despite the dissatisfaction of most physicists with Fresnel's partial aether-dragging hypothesis, repetitions and improvements to Fizeau's experiment (see sections above) by others confirmed his results to high accuracy.

In addition to Mascart's experiments which demonstrated an insensitivity to earth's motion and complaints about the partial aether-dragging hypothesis, another major problem arose with the Michelson–Morley experiment (1887). Mascart's claims that optical experiments of refraction and reflection would be insensitive to the earth's motion were proven out by this later experiment. In Fresnel's theory, the aether is almost stationary and the Earth is moving through it, so the experiment should have given a partially reduced, but net positive, result. Only a complete aether drag by the medium of the air would result in a null. However, the result of this experiment was reported as null. Thus from the viewpoint of the aether models at that time, the experimental situation was contradictory: On one hand, the aberration of light, the Fizeau experiment and its repetition by Michelson and Morley in 1886 appeared to support only a small degree of aether-dragging. On the other hand, the Michelson–Morley experiment of 1887 appeared to prove that the aether is at rest with respect to Earth, apparently supporting the idea of complete aether-dragging (see aether drag hypothesis). So the success of Fresnel's hypothesis in explaining Fizeau's results helped lead to a theoretical crisis, which was only resolved by the introduction of relativistic theory.

Is it fantastic to imagine that someone might have been led to develop some or
all of these kinematical responses to the challenge presented by the situation in the
optics of moving bodies around 1880, given that an optical principle of relative motion had been formulated by Mascart? Perhaps no more fantastic than what actually
happened: Einstein’s development around 1905 of a kinematical response to the challenge presented by the situation in the electrodynamics of moving bodies, given that an
electrodynamic principle of relative motion had already been formulated by Poincaré.

Lorentz's interpretation

In 1892, Hendrik Lorentz proposed a modification of Fresnel's model, in which the aether is completely stationary. He succeeded in deriving Fresnel's dragging coefficient as the result of an interaction between the moving water with an undragged aether. He also discovered that the transition from one to another reference frame could be simplified by using an auxiliary time variable which he called local time:

In 1895, Lorentz more generally explained Fresnel's coefficient based on the concept of local time. However, Lorentz's theory had the same fundamental problem as Fresnel's: a stationary aether contradicted the Michelson–Morley experiment. So in 1892 Lorentz proposed that moving bodies contract in the direction of motion (FitzGerald-Lorentz contraction hypothesis, since George FitzGerald had already arrived in 1889 at this conclusion). The equations that he used to describe these effects were further developed by him until 1904. These are now called the Lorentz transformations in his honor, and are identical in form to the equations that Einstein was later to derive from first principles. Unlike Einstein's equations, however, Lorentz's transformations were strictly ad hoc, their only justification being that they seemed to work.

Derivation in special relativity

Einstein showed how Lorentz's equations could be derived as the logical outcome of a set of two simple starting postulates. In addition Einstein recognized that the stationary aether concept has no place in special relativity, and that the Lorentz transformation concerns the nature of space and time. Together with the moving magnet and conductor problem, the negative aether drift experiments, and the aberration of light, the Fizeau experiment was one of the key experimental results that shaped Einstein's thinking about relativity. Robert S. Shankland reported some conversations with Einstein, in which Einstein emphasized the importance of the Fizeau experiment:

Max von Laue (1907) demonstrated that the Fresnel drag coefficient can be easily explained as a natural consequence of the relativistic formula for addition of velocities, namely:

The speed of light in immobile water is c/n.
From the velocity composition law it follows that the speed of light observed in the laboratory, where water is flowing with speed v (in the same direction as light) is

Thus the difference in speed is (assuming v is small comparing to c, dropping  higher order terms)
 
This is accurate when , and agrees with the formula based upon Fizeau's measurements, which satisfied the condition .

Fizeau's experiment is hence supporting evidence for the collinear case of Einstein's velocity addition formula.

See also
 Tests of special relativity
 Aether drag hypothesis
 History of special relativity

References

Secondary sources

Primary sources

Physics experiments
1851 in science